The Worst is the fourth and final studio album by the Brazilian extreme metal band Sarcófago. Wagner Lamounier and Gerald Minelli view this record as a "summation" of the band's career.

The Worst is notable for not only having a more death metal-oriented sound than the band's earlier works, but also containing traces of the then-popular genre of groove metal. The music is also slower than that on the band's previous album Hate and features a more prominent use of programmed drums.

The album cover features a photograph of Said Augusto, a close friend of the band.

Track listing

Personnel 
 Wagner Lamounier - lead vocals, electric guitar
 Gerald Minelli - backing vocals, bass guitar
 Eugênio "Dead Zone" - keyboards, drum programming

References 

1997 albums
Sarcófago albums